Erkeksen (If You're A Man) is the second studio album by Turkish singer Gülşen. It was released in 1998 by Prestij Müzik and Türküola Müzik. Gülşen wrote the lyrics for the singles "Yiğidim", "Delisin" and "Gözü Karalım", and subsequently separate music videos were released for each of them. Following the album's release, Gülşen received a nomination at the 5th Kral TV Video Music Awards as the "Best Pop Female Artist".

Track listing

References

Gülşen (singer) albums
1998 albums